The Văsui is a right tributary of the river Putna in Romania. It flows into the Putna near Prisaca.

References

Rivers of Romania
Rivers of Vrancea County